Virginia's 61st House of Delegates district elects one of 100 seats in the Virginia House of Delegates, the lower house of Virginia's bicameral state legislature. District 61 represents Amelia, Cumberland, Mecklenburg, and Nottoway counties as well as part of Lunenburg County. The seat is currently held by Republican Thomas C. Wright Jr.

References

61
Amelia County, Virginia
Cumberland County, Virginia
Mecklenburg County, Virginia
Nottoway County, Virginia
Lunenburg County, Virginia